Evelina Petrova (born 27 May 1974, in Kingisepp, Russia) is a Russian composer and accordion player.

Life and career 
«At the Queen Elizabeth Hall, I found myself listening open-mouthed to a Russian woman playing the piano accordion while making wordless vocal sounds into a microphone. Her name was Evelina Petrova and the sounds varied from whoops and bird-like twitterings to a kind of demented lamentation. God knows what it was all about, but it had me transfixed..»
 
Dave Gelly,

THE GUARDIAN 

Evelina Petrova graduated from the Saint Petersburg Musical College and after that studied at Theater Academy in Vyacheslav Gayvoronsky’s class "The Theater of Musical Improvisation". She actively participated in all academic activities provided by Prof. Gayvoronsky. She began with ensembles performances and eventually joined Gayvoronsky in a duo. In 2002, Evelina graduated from Saint Petersburg State Conservatory with a classical accordionist degree.
 
Since 1997, Evelina has been performing in duo with V. Gayvoronsky (trumpet).
 
In October 1998 at the Firth International Astor Piazzolla Competition in Castelfidardo, Italy, the duo was awarded the special prize for original music style.
 
In 1999, by vote of Russian music critics Evelina Petrova was awarded the title of the Star of the Year.
 
Starting from 2001, Evelina has been playing with a Saint Petersburg musician Victor Sobolenko (cello). The duo has recorded an album called "The Northern Tango" with original music by V. Sobolenko in tango style with jazz elements.
 
Besides her other projects, Evelina is performing solo. The first solo album «Year’s Cycle» where she introduced herself not only as a musician, but also as a composer was released in England in 2004 (Leo Records). The album’s twelve compositions represent twelve months of the year.
 
After "Year’s Cycle" solo album Evelina looked for the concepts for her new albums and for new co-performers. In 2007 and 2009, Leo Records released two new CDs by Evelina Petrova: "Upside down" with Alexander Balanescu, one of the most original and unpredictable musicians of our time, and "Living water" which contains music from Evelina’s performance with a dancer Tanya Khabarova. This is one of Evelina’s experimental projects with Tanya, and it’s based on mythology, fairytales, and pagan rituals of ancient Russia.

Performances and collaborations with other musicians 
 Jethro Tull
 Alexander Balanescu
 Phil Milton
 Slava Gayvoronsky
 Iva Bittova
 Viktor Sobolenko
 Bert Van Laethem
 Miniature Musical Circus (UK)
 Tanya Khabarova (theater Derevo)
 Gisele Edwards (rope artist, UK)

Current projects 

 Project with Alexander Balanescu (violin, GB) /www.balanescu.com/
 Performance "Timing of butterfly" with Tanya Khabarova (theater DEREVO)
 Project with Viktor Sobolenko (cello, Russia) "The Northern Tango"/www.sobolenko.narod.ru/
 Collaboration projects by SOUNDUK (England) with Alexander Balanescu and Miniature Musical Circus (London)- "The Others". «Ties» with aerialist Gisele Edwards and director Emma Bernard (UK).
 Live performances with black-white masterpieces: "Faust" by Friedrich Wilhelm Murnau, 1926, Germany; "The Unknown" Director Tod Browning, 1927, USA; short animation films by Lotte Rainiger.
 Composition "Vocalize" ("Shout" on the CD "Upside Down")was featured in the film "The Best of Times" by Svetlana Proskurina.
 Collaborates with Fashion House  "Lilia Kisselenko" (St.Petersburg)  as a composer /www.kisselenko.ru/

Discography 
 "Living water"  Leo Records 2009
 "Upside down"  Leo Records 2007
 «Year’s cycle»  Leo Records 2004
 "The northern tango"  St. Petersburg 2002
 "Homeless songs"  Solyd Records 2001
 «Chonyi Together»  Leo Records  1999
 «Postfactum»  Solyd Records 1999

References

External links 
 Evelina Petrova official website
 Evelina Petrova on MySpace
 Evelyn Petrova Year's Cycle (Leo) by Matthew Sumera
 Year's Cycle. All Music Guide Review.
 Evelyn Petrova. Living Water album rewiev.
 Evelyn Petrova. Living Water album review by Henry Lauer

1974 births
Living people
Russian women composers
Russian accordionists
Women accordionists
21st-century Russian women musicians